Głogoczów  is a village in the administrative district of Gmina Myślenice, within Myślenice County, Lesser Poland Voivodeship, in southern Poland.

The village has a population of 2,800.

References

External links 
 http://glogoczow.malopolska.pl/ Wiejski Dom Kultury w Głogoczowie
 http://wies-jak-dzwon.pl/  Promocja Wsi Tematycznej Głogoczów
 http://www.glogoczow.pl/ Aktualności z życia Głogoczowa

Villages in Myślenice County